Oshlack v Richmond River Council is a decision of the High Court of Australia.

The case is notable for its statements regarding costs orders in the context of public interest litigation. Its facts concerned an application for costs against an unsuccessful litigant in a case relevant to the public interest.

The High Court decided by majority that the discretion of the trial judge not to make a costs order against Oshlack ought be upheld.

Oshlack is an important case in Australian civil procedure. It is the 23rd most cited High Court case according to LawCite.

Facts 

The case facts concerned costs orders following an unsuccessful lawsuit by a Mr Oshlack against Richmond River Council. Oshlack contended that consent given by the council for a subdivision at Evans Head was void, due to breaching the Environmental Planning and Assessment Act 1979 (NSW). He lost that lawsuit.

Subsequently, the council sought to recover legal costs from him. The trial judge, Justice Stein, determined that it was appropriate to make no order as to costs. The Court of Appeal held that his decision had miscarried, for taking into account that the proceedings had been brought in the public interest; which was held by the court to be an irrelevant consideration when making costs orders.

Oshlack subsequently obtained special leave to appeal at the High Court.

Judgement 
By majority the High Court upheld the trial judge's discretion not to award costs. The fact that the case had been brought in the public interest was held not to be an irrelevant consideration.

The court additionally emphasized the discretion available to trial judges, expressing that there is 'no absolute rule ... (that) a successful party is to be compensated by the unsuccessful party' following litigation.

See also 

 Land and Environment Court of New South Wales
 List of High Court of Australia cases

References 

Australian case law
High Court of Australia cases